Boyapati Manoranjan Choudary (born 1946) is an Indian inorganic chemist and a former senior scientist at Indian Institute of Chemical Technology. He is known for his studies on Nanomaterials to Nanomedicine and is an elected fellow of the Indian National Science Academy, and the Indian Academy of Sciences. The Council of Scientific and Industrial Research, the apex agency of the Government of India for scientific research, awarded him the Shanti Swarup Bhatnagar Prize for Science and Technology, one of the highest Indian science awards, in 1990, for his contributions to chemical sciences.

Biography 

B. M. Choudary, born on 10 August 1946 in the south Indian state of Andhra Pradesh, graduated in chemistry from Andhra University and completed his master's degree at Vikram University. His career started as a junior lecturer in chemistry at Kakatiya Medical College in 1970 and after three years, he joined Indian Institute of Chemical Technology (IICT) as a junior research fellow where he spent the rest of his academic career to retire as a senior scientist. In between, he secured a PhD from Gujarat University in 1980 for his thesis on Catalysis in Organic Chemistry. After retirement, he founded Ogene Systems in 2005 where he serves as the managing director.

Choudary's researches on anchored intercalated catalysts returned high selectivity and activity and his work on homogeneous catalysis using transition metal complexes widened the knowledge on the subject. He established a laboratory for researches on catalysis and surface science at Indian Institute of Chemical Technology and hosted a number of researchers there. He published his research findings by way of several peer-reviewed articles and Google Scholar, an online repository of scientific particles, has listed 258 of them. He has mentored 50 doctoral scholars in their studies and holds over several US and Indian patents.

In 2005, Choudary founded Ogene Systems, a firm handling research and manufacturing contracts where he guides several teams engaged in research in nanotechnology, nanomedicine, process development and manufacturing. He is a former member of the editorial board of the Journal of Molecular Catalysis A: Chemical and serves as a guest editor for Topics in Catalysis journal. He has also participated in international meetings on catalysis.

Awards and honors 
The Council of Scientific and Industrial Research awarded him the Shanti Swarup Bhatnagar Prize, one of the highest Indian science awards, in 1990. The Indian Academy of Sciences elected him as their fellow in 1992 and he became an elected fellow of the Indian National Science Academy in 2004. The same year, the Government of Andhra Pradesh awarded him the Andhra Pradesh Scientist Award. He is also an elected fellow of the Andhra Pradesh Academy of Sciences.

Citations

Selected bibliography

See also 
 Nanomedicine
 Nanotechnology
 Catalysis

Notes

References 

Recipients of the Shanti Swarup Bhatnagar Award in Chemical Science
1946 births
Indian scientific authors
Scientists from Andhra Pradesh
Fellows of the Indian Academy of Sciences
Fellows of the Indian National Science Academy
20th-century Indian chemists
Living people
Andhra University alumni
Vikram University alumni
Gujarat University alumni
20th-century Indian inventors
Indian inorganic chemists